is a 1997 horizontally scrolling shooter video game developed and published by Sky Think System for the PlayStation in Japan. Set in a theme park, the game has been described as a cute 'em up and resembles Konami's Parodius games. It has become somewhat of a collector's item, and one of the rarest shooters on the PlayStation.

Gameplay

Harmful Park is a horizontal scrolling 2D shooting game. Enemies in the game include gorillas, inflatable dinosaurs, and a gigantic woman. The game also features exotic weapons, including jelly beans and ice cream. The game has six stages in total. There are four kinds of shots that the player's ship can fire, each with their own strengths and weaknesses. "Pie spread" for example fires continuously, while "Jelly Boomerang" tracks enemies, but has low attack power. Three additional minigames are available as well.

Plot
The game is set in a theme park, after a scientist named Dr. Tequila makes the rides and machines of the park go berserk. Another scientist orders her daughters to reclaim the park, using flying machines. The park has now been converted into a fortified base.

Development
Harmful Park was developed by Japanese game developer Sky Think System, and it was the final game they developed. The developer intended the game to have comedic elements, and to be enjoyable for a wide variety of gamers of all ages and genders.

Release
The game was released in Japan on February 14, 1997 and re-released in 2012 for the PlayStation Network again only in Japan.

Reception
Upon release, Famitsu gave it a score of 26 out of 40.

Multiple reviewers noted the similarities between Harmful Park, and the Parodius series and described the game as a "cute em up".

In 2014, Eurogamer listed the game among gaming's "most valuable treasures", praising the graphics, humor, and noting that while not difficult, it has personality. GamesTM described it as a cross between Parodius, and Coryoon. Retro Gamer listed it as number 6 on their list of "The 20 Greatest PlayStation Games You've Never Played".

Notes

References

External links 
  

1997 video games
Cooperative video games
Japan-exclusive video games
Multiplayer and single-player video games
PlayStation (console) games
PlayStation (console)-only games
PlayStation Network games
Scrolling shooters
Video games developed in Japan
Video games featuring female protagonists
Video games set in amusement parks
Horizontally scrolling shooters